AT-rich interactive domain-containing protein 4B is a protein that in humans is encoded by the ARID4B gene.

Function 

This gene encodes a protein with sequence similarity to retinoblastoma-binding protein-1. The encoded protein is a subunit of the histone deacetylase-dependent SIN3A transcriptional corepressor complex, which functions in diverse cellular processes including proliferation, differentiation, apoptosis, oncogenesis, and cell fate determination. The gene product is recognized by IgG antibody isolated from a breast cancer patient and appears to be a molecular marker associated with a broad range of human malignancies. Alternate transcriptional splice variants encoding different isoforms have been characterized.

References

External links

Further reading